The Bemmel Theaterchurch (Dutch: Theaterkerk Bemmel) is a theater and former Catholic church building in Bemmel, Netherlands.

History 
The church building was built in the period 1872-1873; it was dedicated to Saint Donatus of Arezzo. It was opened in 1873, on August 7: the feast day of Saint Donatus. The building then bore the name 'Holy Donatus Church' (Dutch: Heilige Donatuskerk). 

From 2015 to 2016, the church was converted into a multifunctional building with a theater hall, an entrance hall with a bar, and a few smaller rooms. The building was renamed 'Bemmel Theaterchurch' (Dutch: Theaterkerk Bemmel) and was opened in October 2016.

Gallery

See also 
 Kinkelenburg Castle
 Fort Pannerden

External link 
 Bemmel Theaterchurch Official website

References 

Former churches in the Netherlands
Theatres in the Netherlands
Towers in Gelderland